Warriors of Virtue is a 1997 martial arts fantasy film directed by Hong Kong filmmaker Ronny Yu in his American English-language directorial debut, written by Michael Vickerman and Hugh Kelley, and starring Angus Macfadyen, Mario Yedidia, and Marley Shelton. The film was an international co-production between the United States, China, Hong Kong, and Canada. The film was based on a series of characters created by the Chinese-American Law brothers, four siblings who worked as physicians and had no prior filmmaking experience. The story follows a young boy who stumbles into a mystical world based on the Tao Te Ching, where he meets the titular Warriors of Virtue—anthropomorphic kangaroos who wield the powers of Tao and battle an evil warlord. The Irish band Clannad provided the original song "Forces of Nature".

The film was a critical and commercial failure. It was followed by a direct-to-video sequel, Warriors of Virtue: The Return to Tao, in 2002.

Plot
Middle school student Ryan Jeffers suffers a disability to his leg preventing him from trying out for sports and fitting in. He is currently the waterboy of his school's football team and has a crush on quarterback Brad's girlfriend. He often seeks escape through comic books and dreams of adventure, hiding the depression of his disability from his mother.

One day, the owner of his favorite restaurant, his friend Ming, gives him a manuscript of Tao representing the five elements: Earth, Fire, Water, Wood and Metal. He advises Ryan to live his life no matter his physical limits. That night, Ryan and his best friend Chucky are approached by Brad and his friends who suggest an initiation for their group. Leading them to a water plant, Ryan is told he needs to cross a narrow pipe to sign his name on a wall of graffiti. Ignoring Chucky's protests, Ryan attempts to cross, but a water pipe opens up and throws Ryan into the water.

Ryan wakes in a strange forest and is attacked by assailants who are drawn off by a creature from the lake. As he escapes, he realizes his leg works. He meets a dwarf-like man named Mudlap before a beautiful girl named Elysia drives him off. She tells Ryan that he is in Tao. Ryan tells her about the manuscript, which had been lost with his backpack. Believing it to be the Manuscript of Legend, Elysia takes Ryan to Master Chung and he meets four of the five warriors, anthropomorphic kangaroos each representing an element: Lai, Warrior of Wood; Chi, Warrior of Fire; Tsun, Warrior of Earth; and Yee, Warrior of Metal. He is told that Yun, the Warrior of Water, had left them following an earlier conflict, and that the manuscript would be sought by Komodo, a warlord who betrayed the Warriors and is stealing from the Lifesprings of Tao to stay young forever. Ryan is captured by Komodo's henchmen Mantose, Barbarocious, and Dullard, but is saved by Yun. Ryan convinces Yun to return to the Lifespring.

Ryan flees, wanting to return home, but Mudlap leads him into General Grillo's arms and he is saved by Chung. Yun, Yee and Chi go after the manuscript and fall into a trap after being betrayed by Elysia, who joined Komodo as vengeance against Yun for killing her brother by accident. They are nearly killed in a trap, but narrowly escape using their skills and they return to the Lifespring to prevent Komodo from ambushing the others. Komodo fights Chung and ultimately kills him, then makes off with Ryan.

When Ryan awakens at Komodo's palace, Elysia begs him to read from the book so that Komodo could possibly invade his world for more Lifesprings. Ryan realizes he can't read the book and this upsets Komodo, who tries to strike Ryan down. Elysia interferes and is struck down by Barbarocious. Komodo kills Barbarocious in rage as Ryan escapes. Komodo returns to the Lifespring and challenges the Warriors to one-on-one combat, splitting into five versions of himself. He taunts and defeats the warriors while Ryan, after getting an apology from Mudlap for his betrayal, finds an inscription in the manuscript. Ryan tricks Komodo into overusing his power, weakening him so that the warriors can purify his spirit, reforming him to a kind man and purifying his army. Ryan, mortally wounded, is surrounded by his friends and Yee astonishes his comrades by thanking Ryan, speaking for the first time in years.

Suddenly, Ryan is back at the water plant before crossing the pipe. Realizing his desperation to fit in led to his accident, this time he refuses to cross it. The water pipe opens like it did before, trapping Brad on the other side. His insults to his friends only prompt them to leave him behind for the police to find. That night, Ryan apologizes to his mother for an earlier argument. When he goes to bed, he offers to tell his dog about Tao.

Cast
 Mario Yedidia as Ryan Jeffers, a young boy with a disabled leg.
 Angus Macfadyen as Komodo, an evil warlord and sorcerer that seeks to conquer Tao and then Earth.
 Marley Shelton as Elysia, a young woman who lives in Tao.
 Chao-Li Chi as Master Chung, the master of the Warriors
 Michael J. Anderson as Mudlap, a dwarf-like creature.
 Tom Towles as General Grillo, one of Komodo's henchmen.
 Lee Arenberg as Mantose, one of Komodo's henchmen. 
 Dennis Dun as Ming, the owner of Ryan's favorite restaurant.
 Don W. Lewis as Mayor Keena, the mayor of the village where Master Chung lives.
 Teryl Rothery as Kathryn Jeffers, Ryan's mom.
 Rickey D'Shon Collins as Chucky, Ryan's best friend.
 Michael Dubrow as Brad, a quarterback at Ryan's school.
 Ying Qu as Barbarotious, a female follower of Komodo.
 Stuart Kingston as Dullard, one of Komodo's henchmen.
 Gill Butler and Victoria Schoenke as Villagers
 Michael Vickerman as Dragoon Commander, a full-armored minion of Komodo that leads his Dragoons.
 Adam Mills as Toby

In-suit performers
 Jack Tate as Yun, the Warrior of Water and Virtue of Benevolence
 Doug Jones as Yee, the Warrior of Metal and Virtue of Righteousness
 Don W. Lewis as Lai, the Warrior of Wood and Virtue of Order
 J. Todd Adams as Chi, the Warrior of Fire and Virtue of Wisdom
 Adrienne Corcoran as Tsun, the Warrior of Earth and Virtue of Loyalty
 Roy Cebellos as Willy Beest, a humanoid cape buffalo.
 Jason Hamer as Mosely, a humanoid rhinoceros.

Voices
 Mina E. Mina as Master Chung
 Scott McNeil as Yun
 Doug Parker as Yee, Chi
 Dale Wilson as Lai
 Kathleen Barr as Tsun
 Jay Brazeau as Willy Beest
 Garry Chalk as Mosely
 Ian James Corlett as Mayor Keena
 Venus Terzo as Barbarotious
 Drew Reichelt as Dullard
 Colin Murdock as Dragoon Commander
 Ward Perry as Villager
 Shane Meier as Toby

Production
Warriors cost $56 million to produce. The film's producers, brothers Ron, Dennis, Christopher and Jeremy Law, were surgeons by trade and had never produced a film before. Their father, Joseph Law, was a wealthy toy manufacturer in China, who put up most of the reported $36 million shooting budget, though reportedly other investors were also involved. MGM distributed the film and sunk a reported $20 million on prints and advertising. The movie began shooting January 15, 1996 and completed shooting May 9, 1996. The 8 animatronic kangaroos used to bring to life the titular Warriors were designed and created by Tony Gardner. Gardner spent the first half of 1996 in China, working on shots for the film and creating seven animatronic characters. “When I came back, I realized the problem of ‘disappearing’ like that for a long time: People in the industry tend to forget who you are. But in talking to people, to remind them what we did, I thought: There’s no reason we couldn’t do all a film’s visual effects work under one roof.”

The costumes for the creatures, the makeup, and the animatronic character effects were provided by Tony Gardner and his company Alterian, Inc.

Reception
Warriors of Virtue received negative reviews from critics. Film critic Kale Klein of the Carlsbad Current-Argus was so physically distressed by the film that he actually vomited during the initial screenings. On an episode of Siskel and Ebert, Gene Siskel voted thumbs down and described Warriors of Virtue as "Generic junk made for the international action market, a cheap hybrid of Power Rangers and Ninja Turtles." Roger Ebert also voted thumbs down, however he praised the set design by Eugenio Zanetti and said in his review "he made a great setting for a stupid story". Wade Major of Boxoffice Magazine thought it "could be the most impressive Hollywood debut yet for a Hong Kong director, although lackluster writing and a needlessly muddled storyline somewhat tarnish the effort." It currently has an 18% rating on Rotten Tomatoes based on 11 reviews.

Home video reception
The film did not do much better when it hit video, earning $7.69 million from the date of its release in September 1997 through mid-December of that year.

Other media

Toys
A line of action figures based on the film was manufactured and released by Play 'Em LLC.

Sequel
A second film titled Warriors of Virtue: The Return to Tao was released on October 22, 2002. It was directed by the first film's co-writer Michael Vickerman with Nathan Phillips replacing Yedidia as Ryan Jeffers along with Nina Liu as Amythis, Shedrack Anderson III as Chucky and Kevin Smith (his final role) as Dogon, a villain bent on taking over our world and Tao.

References

External links
 The Doug Jones Experience - Doug Jones as 'Yee'
 
 
 
 Warriors of Virtue at Box Office Mojo

1997 films
1990s fantasy adventure films
1997 martial arts films
American fantasy adventure films
American children's adventure films
American children's fantasy films
Chinese fantasy adventure films
1990s children's fantasy films
Films scored by Don Davis (composer)
Films about animals
Films about kangaroos and wallabies
Films directed by Ronny Yu
Films set in the United States
Films set in China
Films shot in Beijing
Films shot in Vancouver
Martial arts fantasy films
Metro-Goldwyn-Mayer films
1990s English-language films
1990s American films